Poda pitha (Odia: ପୋଡ଼ ପିଠା) is slow-cooked pitha. It is made by slowly baking fermented rice, black gram, grated coconut and jaggery overnight. Its crust is slightly burnt, while the inside is soft and white. Poda pitha is generally made during Raja Parba. It is served to Lord Jagannath and his siblings at Mausi Maa Temple on their way back after Ratha-Yatra, from Gundicha Temple to Jagannath Temple, Puri.

See also 
 Odia cuisine
 Raja Parba
 Jagannath Temple, Puri

References 

Odia cuisine